Lionel Proctor (born 27 November 1979) is an indigenous former  Australian rules footballer who played in the Australian Football League (AFL) between 1998 and 2001 for the Richmond Football Club.

References
 Holmesby, Russell & Main, Jim (2005) The Encyclopedia of AFL Footballers, Bas Publishing, Melbourne.

External links

Richmond Football Club players
Living people
Indigenous Australian players of Australian rules football
1979 births
Northern Knights players
Australian rules footballers from Victoria (Australia)